Archipimima consentanea is a species of moth of the  family Tortricidae. It was described by Razowski in 2004. It is found in Santa Catarina, Brazil.

The ground colour of the forewings is pale ferruginous brown, suffused greyish along the wing edges and strigulated (finely streaked) rust brown. The forewings are marked with a few concolorous lines. The markings are rust brown. The hindwings are glossy bronze brown.

References

Atteriini
Moths described in 2004
Moths of South America
Taxa named by Józef Razowski